The Haiti national under-15 football team represents Haiti in international football at this age level and is controlled by the Fédération Haïtienne de Football (FHF).

Competitive record

CONCACAF Under-15 Championship

Summer Youth Olympics

See also
Haiti national football team
Haiti national under-17 football team
Haiti national under-20 football team
Haiti national under-23 football team

References

u15
Haiti